313 Presents is a live entertainment company based in Detroit. 313 Presents promotes and produces concerts, theatrical productions, sporting events and family shows at six venues across southeast Michigan including Little Caesars Arena, Fox Theatre, Comerica Park, Pine Knob Music Theatre, Meadow Brook Amphitheatre and Michigan Lottery Amphitheatre. Headquartered in The District Detroit, 313 Presents is a joint venture between Olympia Entertainment, owner of the National Hockey League's Detroit Red Wings and Major League Baseball's Detroit Tigers, and Palace Sports & Entertainment, owner of the National Basketball Association's Detroit Pistons. 

The venture was formally announced on October 6, 2017, and was initially staffed by 40 employees representing the two companies. 313 Presents was formed in the wake of the closure of The Palace of Auburn Hills, which resulted from the PS&E-owned Pistons' move to Olympia Entertainment-operated Little Caesars Arena. The company takes its name from the area code for Detroit, 313.

References

External links 

2017 establishments in Michigan
Olympia Entertainment
Companies based in Detroit